Andy Gillet (born 8 July 1981) is a French fashion model and actor primarily known for his work in European Auteur cinema in such films as Éric Rohmer's Romance of Astree and Celadon (2007) or Andrzej Żuławski's Cosmos (2015). As a model Gillet represented numerous brands for their ad campaigns including Hermès, Valentino or Burberry; the last two having been shot by Mario Testino and he was the face of the fragrance 'Kenzo Power' by Kenzo Takada.

Early life and education 
Gillet grew up in Sallanches in Haute Savoie, the son of a policeman and a secretary, he has a younger brother. He completed his studies at Nancy Business School and moved to Paris.

Career 
Before he could manage to make a living from acting, Gillet was a theater usher but didn't have enough money to enroll in the 'Eva-Saint-Paul Drama School'. Due to his androgynous beauty, Gillet was then sent to Japan by an agency for four months to land modelling contracts but once in Tokyo, he found no work or relationship and felt lost in translation. From this failure, Gillet drew motivation declaring:"This period of hardship I went through there forced me to reflect and made me mature. I returned to France with the 'niaque': no more dilemmas, I want to play. I changed my life."He first appeared on stage in the title role of Caligula, in a celebrated staging by Charles Berling. He made his television debut in 2005, in the role of Hugh Despenser the Younger in the remake miniseries Les Rois maudits, based on the French novel series of the same name by Maurice Druon. He also appeared in series such as Éternelle and Un village français. His debut in cinema came in 2006, with Nouvelle chance by Anne Fontaine and L'homme de sa vie by Zabou Breitman. The following year, he appeared in acclaimed director Eric Rohmer's final film, Les Amours d'Astrée et de Céladon.

Private life 
Gillet publicly shares on social media that his partner is musician, singer and actor Brice Michelini from Cannes who appeared in Rebecca Zlotowski's Planétarium (2016). When asked why he chose to write the song Andy, I Love You (French: Andy, Je T'aime) and have him acting in the music video, Michelini declared: "Because I love Andy. Andy, he's the man I love. This name came to me before I even made music. Andy is a muse: not just mine, a lot of people's muse. For me it was a waste to live with a muse and not do anything with it."

Filmography

Film

Television

Theatre

References

External links 

1981 births
Living people
People from Saint-Denis, Réunion
French male models
French male stage actors
French male film actors